This is a list of mobile network operators in Tanzania:

As of 2018, there were an estimated 43,497,261 million mobile phone subscribers out of an estimated population of 53,853,702 people, representing an 80.77 percent penetration rate. At the same time, the country's internet customers numbered 22,281,727, representing a 41.37 percent penetration rate.

Market share
As of December 2018, the market share among Tanzanian mobile telephone operators, as reported by those operators, was as follows:

 Note:Totals may be slightly off due to rounding.

See also
 Tanzania Communications Regulatory Authority
 Economy of Tanzania

References

 
Tanzania communications-related lists
Lists of companies of Tanzania